Rob Guillory (born June 2, 1982) is an American comic book artist. Born, raised, and currently based in Lafayette, Louisiana, Guillory is most known for his art on Chew, published by Image Comics.

Career
Guillory began his comic art career during a four-year stint as cartoonist at the University of Louisiana at Lafayette. From there, Guillory went on to work on several indie comic anthology projects, such as Teddy Scares from Ape Entertainment and Image Comics' Popgun Anthology.

In 2009, Guillory began working on his first major comics project, the New York Times Best-selling Chew, written by John Layman and published by Image Comics. The book went on to achieve much success, being nominated for two Harvey Awards (including Best New Talent for Guillory), two Eagle Awards and winning an Eisner Award for Best New Series in 2010.

Rob Guillory is credited with drawing title cards for The High Fructose Adventures of Annoying Orange for Cartoon Network. 

In 2019 Guillory began work on his own comic, Farmhand, which he both writes and illustrates.

In April 2022, Guillory was reported among the more than three dozen comics creators who contributed to Operation USA's benefit anthology book, Comics for Ukraine: Sunflower Seeds, a project spearheaded by IDW Publishing Special Projects Editor Scott Dunbier, whose profits would be donated to relief efforts for Ukrainian refugees resulting from the February 2022 Russian invasion of Ukraine. Guillory and John Layman teamed up to contribute a new Chew story to the anthology.

References

External links

 
 CHEW Official Blog
 

1982 births
Living people
African-American comics creators
American comics artists
People from Lafayette, Louisiana
University of Louisiana at Lafayette alumni
21st-century African-American people
20th-century African-American people